Hermágoras Manglés (born 26 April 1974) is a Venezuelan judoka. He competed in the men's half-middleweight event at the 2000 Summer Olympics.

References

1974 births
Living people
Venezuelan male judoka
Olympic judoka of Venezuela
Judoka at the 2000 Summer Olympics
Place of birth missing (living people)